Thomas Shelton was an American aircraft designer and inventor of the vortex ring gun, which he developed into vortex ring toys.

References

Year of birth missing
Year of death missing
American aerospace designers